Reuven Amitai (born August 23, 1955), also Reuven Amitai-Preiss, is an Israeli-American historian and writer, specializing in pre-modern Islamic civilization, especially Syria and Palestine during the time of the Mamluk Empire. In his 20s he moved to Israel, and became history professor at the Hebrew University of Jerusalem. As of 2012 he is the Dean of the Faculty of Humanities at the Hebrew University.

Biography
Amitai was born in Philadelphia in 1955, and studied at the University of Pennsylvania. In 1976 he made the aliyah to Israel, intending to live and work on a kibbutz while also pursuing Middle Eastern Studies. He worked at the kibbutz for six  years as a welder, and then decided to return to academic studies. He enrolled at the Hebrew University of Jerusalem, where he eventually received a Masters and Doctorate, focusing on the history of Islam, especially during the time of the Crusades, the Mamluks, and the Mongol Empire, a time period spanning the 11th to 16th centuries. He spent a year as a visiting fellow at Princeton University from 1990–91, and St. Antony's College in Oxford from 1996–97. Returning to the Hebrew University, he became a teacher, then Chairman of the Department of Islamic and Middle Eastern Studies from 1997–2001, and director of the Institute of Asian and African Studies twice, in 2001–04 and 2008–10. Around 2005, he became director of the Nehemia Levtzion Center for Islamic Studies, whose goal was to encourage research public activity related to Islamic studies. From 2010 to 2014, he served as Dean of the Faculty of Humanities at the Hebrew University of Jerusalem.

Selected publications

Books

Articles

References

External links
Personal site of Prof. Reuven Amitai
List of published works by Reuven Amitai
A speech by Reuven Amitai in Estoril Conferences of 2013

1955 births
Living people
Writers from Philadelphia
20th-century Israeli historians
Historians of the Middle East
Jewish scholars of Islam
Academic staff of the Hebrew University of Jerusalem
University of Pennsylvania alumni
21st-century Israeli historians